Babesia bovis is an Apicomplexan single-celled parasite of cattle which occasionally infects humans. The disease it and other members of the genus Babesia cause is a hemolytic anemia known as babesiosis and colloquially called Texas cattle fever, redwater or piroplasmosis. It is transmitted by bites from infected larval ticks of the order Ixodida.  It was eradicated from the United States by 1943, but is still present in Mexico and much of the world's tropics. The chief vector of Babesia species is the southern cattle fever tick Rhipicephalus microplus (formerly Boophilus microplus).

In 2007, the sequence of its genome was announced. Measuring 8.2 million base pairs, its genome is remarkably similar to the genome of Theileria parva, the cause of East Coast fever (theileriosis) in cattle.

Infection 

Babesia bovis is transmitted transovarially, from the female ticks to the eggs, and can remain resident in tick populations for up to four years without infecting a vertebrate host. More commonly, a larval tick feeds upon a domestic cow, an African buffalo or a water buffalo, releasing the parasites into the animal's bloodstream. The involvement of the larval stage of the ticks in the cycle is specific to B. bovis; other Babesia species only involve adult ticks. The parasites then invade individual red blood cells, multiplying and destroying the host cells until the animal is stricken with hemolytic anemia. Adult ticks which feed upon infected cattle are infected themselves, completing the cycle. In humans, infection is rare and usually only affects splenectomized patients.

See also
List of diseases eradicated from the United States

References

External links 

Current status of Bovine babesiosis worldwide at OIE. WAHID Interface - OIE World Animal Health Information Database
Disease card

bovis
Parasites of mammals